Kimberly Ince (born 10 October 2004) is a Grenadian swimmer. She competed in the women's 50 metre backstroke event at the 2018 FINA World Swimming Championships (25 m), in Hangzhou, China. She competed at the 2020 Summer Olympics.

References

External links
 

2004 births
Living people
Grenadian female swimmers
Female backstroke swimmers
Olympic swimmers of Grenada
Swimmers at the 2020 Summer Olympics
Pan American Games competitors for Grenada
Swimmers at the 2019 Pan American Games
Place of birth missing (living people)